TCH is a chemotherapy regimen consisting of Taxotere (docetaxel), carboplatin and Herceptin (trastuzumab), which is used to treat breast cancer.

References

Chemotherapy regimens used in breast cancer